The Bachas is the gotra of Yaduwanshi Rajputs. Bachas and Vats are different gotra of Yaduwanshi Chauhan Rajput. People of these gotras are the descendants of Prithviraj Chauhan. Most of the people related to these gotras lives in Noida , Haridwar, Bijnor districts of Western Uttar Pradesh, Haryana, Delhi, etc. They are also prevalently found in coastal Odisha. The vats and bachas both the gotra comes under Yaduwanshi Rajput.

Many Bachas or Bachal Rajputs are said to get the name from queen Bachchal (Hindi: बाछल), who was mother of famous folk-deity, Jaharveer Gogaji. Goga (Hindi: गोगा) was born to queen Bachchal (the daughter of a Rajput ruler, Kanwarpala ruled over Sirsa in present-day Haryana) and king Zewar in Dadrewa, the ancient capital of Chauhan Rulers in the Churu district of Rajasthan. According to another legend Gogaji was son of a Chauhan Rajput Ruler named Vacha or Juar, whose wife Bachal (Hindi: बाछल) was from Tomar/Tuar clan. The apparent reference to parents of Gogaji is same except slight difference in names due to different dialects being spoken those part of Rajasthan and Haryana.

References

Social groups of Haryana
Social groups of Uttar Pradesh
Social groups of Rajasthan
Rajput clans of Haryana
Rajput clans of Uttar Pradesh
Rajput clans of Rajasthan